The Henan Famine of 1942–1943 occurred in Henan, most particularly within the eastern and central part of the province. The famine occurred within the context of the Second Sino-Japanese War and resulted from a combination of natural and human factors. Modern quantitative studies put the death toll to be "well under one million", probably around 700,000. 15 years later Henan was struck by the deadlier Great Chinese famine.

Famine

Causes 
Henan had previously suffered as a result of the war. Thousands of its young men had already been conscripted. In 1938 the Nationalist government flooded the Yellow River in an attempt to stop the advance of the Japanese, flooding through eastern and central Henan, central Anhui and north-central Jiangsu. As many as 400,000 to 500,000 Northern Chinese civilians and Japanese soldiers may have died from famine, disease and flooding. When Japanese troops did enter the area they caused much destruction, which contributed to causing the famine. By the time of the famine itself, Henan was divided, with the eastern half of the province under occupation by Japan and the western half part unoccupied and nominally under the authority of the Nationalist government based in Chongqing.

In 1942 the spring and summer rains failed, causing drought. In addition to this, locusts caused much damage to the existing harvest. The result was that the supply of grain in the affected areas was reduced greatly. This started to make itself felt by the winter of that year. Yet Chinese and Japanese authorities in the affected areas continued their grain requisition policies in order to feed their soldiers. Environmental historian Micah S. Muscolino also suggests that there is a link between the deliberate flooding of the Yellow River in 1938 and the 1942 famine as the flooding 'contributed to a total disruption of Henan's hydraulic and agricultural systems'.

The terrible conditions that the famine created were vividly described by journalist Theodore White in a special report written for Time magazine, published in March 1943. Cannibalism was rife and parents sold their children just to survive. Disease bred in these conditions, contributing greatly to the death toll. Relief efforts were organized by the government, and by Christian missionaries operating in the area.

In his work China's War with Japan, 1937 – 1945, which is broadly sympathetic to Chiang Kai-shek, Rana Mitter places much of the blame at the hands of corrupt or incompetent local officials. He notes that Chiang announced a reduction in the grain quota for Henan, but the head of the Henan grain administration collected more than the quota demanded anyway. Officials in the neighboring provinces refused to send their surplus grain to Henan. A further example of this incompetence and corruption comes from Runan County where a grain storage system had been set up at the outbreak of war. However, officials there had never actually stored the grain and used it instead to make private deals. Theodore White described being invited to a feast by local authorities which included delicacies such as 'chicken, beef, water chestnut and three cakes with sugar frosting'. The Chongqing government is, however, blamed for reacting slowly and sending paper money instead of food for relief. Mitter notes that the famine can be seen as a consequence of the reduction of the Nationalist government's authority over the provinces as the war dragged on. He also says that Chiang's government was also reluctant to press further for a reduction in the grain tax when national survival was at stake.

Death toll 
Modern academics put the famine deaths to be "well under one million", probably around 700,000. The official count of 1,484,983, compiled in 1943, was later found to grossly exaggerated as it included fertility loss (decline in births) and outward migration. Quantitative calculations found that "fertility loss and excess deaths would have made a similar contribution to total population loss [of combined 1,484,983]".

Another common incorrect figure, 3 to 5 millions deaths, is "generally unsourced or based on the estimates of eyewitnesses such as Theodore White, and always without reference to detailed demographic data". Such high-end estimate given by communist academics is politically motivated to make the Great Chinese famine in 1959-1961 look less deadly.

Below shows the county breakdown of the grossly exaggerated official count of 1,484,983, compiled in 1943. The figures is better served as a comparison among counties on the level of famine severity.

Political ramifications
In Communist-controlled areas, the authorities did reduce the grain quotas for those most affected by the drought. Mao Zedong exploited this for propaganda purposes to portray his government as more benevolent than the Nationalist government. This was effective as it became 'an obvious point of comparison'. The Communists were able to pursue this policy in part because they depended on guerilla warfare and did not need to maintain a standing army in order to participate in the wartime alliance.

Legacy
The Chinese famine of 1942–1943 has been referred to as 'China's forgotten famine', overshadowed by the war that took place around it and the much greater famine of 1958–61. Even in Henan itself this tragic period is not well remembered or talked about, with novelist Liu Zhenyun saying that there is a 'collective amnesia' in the province. Interest in the event has rekindled in recent years, however, with the release of the film Back to 1942, adapted from Liu Zhenyun's novel Remembering 1942.

References

Further reading
 Garnaut, Anthony. "A quantitative description of the Henan famine of 1942." Modern Asian Studies 47.6 (2013): 2007-2045. DOI: https://doi.org/10.1017/S0026749X13000103
 Muscolino, Micah S. The Ecology of War in China: Henan Province, the Yellow River, and Beyond, 1938–1950 (Cambridge UP, 2014).
 Ó Gráda, Cormac. "The ripple that drowns? Twentieth‐century famines in China and India as economic history 1." Economic History Review 61 (2008): 5-37 online.

External links
  Images of the famine

1942 in China
1943 in China
1942
Second Sino-Japanese War
Disasters in Henan
20th-century famines